John Silas Vann (June 7, 1890 – June 10, 1958) was a Major League Baseball catcher. He played with the St. Louis Cardinals for one game as a pinch hitter on June 11, 1913. In his only major league at-bat, he struck out.

Vann started his professional baseball career in 1909. He hit under .250 each year until 1913. That year, besides making it to the majors, he also hit .328 in the Western League. Vann continued to play in the minor leagues until 1926. From 1924 to 1926, he managed the Corsicana Oilers of the Texas Association, winning two pennants.

Vann was Cherokee and was descended from several Cherokee chiefs.

References

External links

1890 births
1958 deaths
20th-century Native Americans
Bartlesville Boosters players
Baseball players from Oklahoma
Birmingham Barons players
Cherokee Nation sportspeople
Cherokee Nation people (1794–1907)
Dallas Marines players
Hartford Senators players
Little Rock Travelers players
Major League Baseball catchers
Minor league baseball managers
Oakland Oaks (baseball) players
People from Fairland, Oklahoma
Salt Lake City Bees players
Shreveport Gassers players
Sioux City Packers players
St. Louis Cardinals players
Terre Haute Highlanders players
Terre Haute Terre-iers players
Waco Navigators players